Reba Nell McEntire is a compilation album by American country music singer Reba McEntire. It was released on February 10, 1986, by Mercury Records. The album consists of songs recorded during McEntire's tenure at Mercury Records that had been unreleased until years after her departure from the label. Mercury Records released the album on the same day that MCA Records released McEntire's tenth studio album, Whoever's in New England.

Track listing

Personnel
Adapted from the album liner notes.
 Bill Brunt - album design
 Dennis Carney - photography
 Jerry Kennedy - producer
 Reba McEntire - lead vocals
 Bergen White - string arrangements
 Hank Williams - mastering

Chart performance

References

Reba McEntire albums
Albums produced by Jerry Kennedy
1986 compilation albums
Mercury Records compilation albums